Lars Sebastian ”Basse” Lindeman (23 March 1920, in Viipuri– 14 September 2006, in Lahti) was a Finnish politician and ambassador.

Lindeman completed his degree in agricultural engineering in 1944. He worked in the municipality of Ingå since 1945 and as a representative of the Finlands Svenska Arbetarförbund since 1947. He was a Social Democratic MP from the Uusimaa constituency between 1958 and 1976, after which he became Ambassador to Oslo and Reykjavik between 1976 and 1984 and to Lisbon in 1984-1985. He was the second Minister of Agriculture in Paasio I Cabinet from 1966 to 1968.

References 

1920 births
2006 deaths
Diplomats from Vyborg
Swedish-speaking Finns
Social Democratic Party of Finland politicians
Ministers of Agriculture of Finland
Members of the Parliament of Finland (1958–62)
Members of the Parliament of Finland (1962–66)
Members of the Parliament of Finland (1966–70)
Members of the Parliament of Finland (1970–72)
Members of the Parliament of Finland (1972–75)
Members of the Parliament of Finland (1975–79)
Ambassadors of Finland to Iceland
Ambassadors of Finland to Norway
Ambassadors of Finland to Portugal
Politicians from Vyborg